The 2013 Chinese Grand Prix (formally known as the 2013 Formula 1 UBS Chinese Grand Prix) was a Formula One motor race that was held on 14 April 2013 at the Shanghai International Circuit in Shanghai, China. The race was the third round of the 2013 season, and marked the tenth running of the Chinese Grand Prix as a round of the Formula One World Championship. The race was won by Fernando Alonso.

Report

Background
Like the 2012 Chinese Grand Prix, tyre supplier Pirelli brought its white-banded medium compound tyre as the harder "prime" tyre and the yellow-banded soft compound tyre as the softer "option" tyre.

Qualifying

Q1
As in previous qualifying sessions, the Caterham and Marussia cars were eliminated in the first round of qualifying. Sauber's Esteban Gutiérrez and Williams's Valtteri Bottas were also eliminated. The fastest time of 1:35.793 was posted by Lewis Hamilton. All cars were comfortably within the 107% cutoff time of 1:42.498.

Q2
Mark Webber, who had posted the 4th fastest time in Q1, ran out of fuel during his second attempt to post a time. Unable to provide the required 1 litre fuel sample, he was penalised by being forced to start at the back of the grid. As they did with Sebastian Vettel when he ran out of fuel during qualifying for the 2012 Abu Dhabi Grand Prix, the Red Bull team opted to change the gearbox on Webber's car to improve his overtaking ability, thereby obliging him to start from pit lane.

Eliminated from qualifying were Vergne, Maldonado, Webber, Sutil, Pérez and di Resta.

Q3

Lewis Hamilton in the Mercedes once again posted the fastest time of the session to take pole position. Lotus Renault's Kimi Räikkönen was second and Ferrari's Fernando Alonso was third.

Hülkenberg opted to preserve his tyres and did not post a time for Q3. Vettel also failed to log a time, aborting his attempt after a braking problem. Jenson Button did a token lap to secure the eighth qualifying position.

Race

Lewis Hamilton led from the start, ahead of Fernando Alonso, Felipe Massa and a slow-starting Kimi Räikkönen. Mark Webber was forced to pit for new tyres at the end of the first lap. Paul di Resta and Adrian Sutil lightly collided, with no damage suffered on either cars.

On lap 4, Alonso and Massa both passed Hamilton at exactly the same time on the first corner. Daniel Ricciardo was forced to pit a short time before. Nico Rosberg pitted on lap 5. On this same lap, Esteban Gutiérrez misjudged his braking into the hairpin at the end of the very long back straight, and went straight into the back of Adrian Sutil. Gutiérrez was out straight away, while Sutil was able to make it back to the pits. However, as he came in to try and fix the damage, his exhaust caught fire, and he retired from the race.

On laps 6 and 7, the pit lane was full of chaos, as Alonso, Massa, Räikkönen, Jules Bianchi, Giedo van der Garde, Max Chilton, Romain Grosjean, and Pastor Maldonado were all forced to pit due to heavy tyre degradation. Nico Hülkenberg found himself leading the race afterwards, ahead of Sebastian Vettel, Jenson Button, Sergio Pérez, and Paul di Resta.

Eventually on lap 14, Vettel, Hülkenberg, and di Resta pitted. At the same time, Mark Webber hit Jean-Éric Vergne, with both Vergne and Webber being forced to pit. Webber's troubles were not over however, because on the next lap, while driving around the hairpin on the back straight, his right rear wheel came off, and he was forced out. Then moments later, Räikkönen nudged the back of Pérez's McLaren, and damaged his Lotus's front wing. However, it wasn't damaged enough for him to pit, and he was able to continue.

On the 19th lap, Massa and Rosberg came in again to change their tyres, leaving Alonso and Button 1st and 2nd. Two laps later, Räikkönen and Hamilton pitted, but Nico Rosberg's race was over due to problems with his suspension. Alonso, Button, Grosjean, Ricciardo, Maldonado and Pérez pitted on lap 23, with Vettel taking the lead of the race. Alonso then set the fastest lap of the race, and began to reduce Vettel's lead, and Vettel was told on the radio to not resist an attack by Alonso. On lap 28, Alonso took the lead from Vettel. Both Vettel and Hülkenberg pitted on the next lap, for new hard compound tyres. Di Resta stopped 3 laps later, while Räikkönen and Valtteri Bottas pitted on lap 34. They were followed two laps later by Hülkenberg and Massa, and finally Hamilton, Grosjean and Vergne one lap later.

Alonso pitted for the last time on lap 41, while Räikkönen and Hamilton no longer needed to pit. However, Button and Vettel still had one pit stop to go. Button pitted on lap 49, Vettel on lap 51, and also di Resta on lap 53. There was an exciting duel between Hamilton and Vettel for the final podium slot, as Vettel reduced a 10-second gap, to only a few tenths within five laps. Alonso finally crossed the line to score his 31st grand prix victory on his 200th grand prix start, 10 seconds ahead of Räikkönen, while Hamilton managed to hold off Vettel for third place. Jenson Button finished fifth, Massa finished sixth, while Daniel Ricciardo drove an outstanding race to finish seventh, his best ever Formula One result. The final points positions were taken by di Resta, Grosjean and Hülkenberg.

Classification

Qualifying

Webber originally qualified 14th but moved to the back of the grid for failing to provide a one-litre fuel sample after qualifying. The Red Bull team opted to change Webber's gearbox to improve his straight line speed and overtaking ability, obliging them to start from pit lane.

Race

Championship standings after the race

Drivers' Championship standings

Constructors' Championship standings

 Note: Only the top five positions are included for both sets of standings.

References

External links
Official Site

Chinese
Grand Prix
Chinese Grand Prix
April 2013 sports events in China